Hvalsø is a town and a former municipality (Danish, kommune) in Region Sjælland on the island of Zealand (Sjælland) in east Denmark. The former municipality covered an area of 72 km2, and had a total population of 7,856 (2005).  Its last mayor was Virginia Holst, a member of the Venstre (Liberal Party)  political party. She was the first foreign national becoming mayor in a Danish municipality.

The town of Hvalsø
The town of Hvalsø (officially called Kirke Hvalsø) is located almost equidistant from the larger towns of Roskilde to the northeast, Ringsted to the south, and Holbæk to the northwest. On 1 January 2022 the town has a population of 4,294.

The large, state-owned and managed, wooded area, Bidstrup Woods (Bidstrup Skovene), is located south of the town, and offers many recreational possibilities.  There is a system of hiking trails, some connecting to neighboring Skjoldenæsholm Forest District (Skjoldenæsholm Skovdistrikt).

As a railway station town, Hvalsø has regional train connections to Copenhagen, Roskilde, Holbæk and Kalundborg.

Hvalsø will house the municipal council in the new Lejre municipality.

Hvalsø municipality 1970-2006

 Hvalsø Parish
 Kisserup Parish
 Såby Parish
 Særløse Parish

On 1 January 2007 Hvalsø municipality ceased to exist as the result of Kommunalreformen ("The Municipality Reform" of 2007).  It was merged with Bramsnæs and Lejre municipalities to form the new Lejre municipality.  This created a municipality with an area of 240 km2 and a total population of 25,971 (2005).

Notable people
 Christian E.O. Jensen (1859–1941) a pharmacists and botanist, a leading bryologist, he ran a pharmacy in Hvalsø
 Sara Blædel (born 1964), author, grew up in Hvalsø 
 Cathrine Dufour (born 1992) a Danish Olympic dressage rider, competed at the 2016 Summer Olympics

See also
 Skullerupholm

References

External links 

  

Municipal seats of Region Zealand
Municipal seats of Denmark
Former municipalities of Denmark
Cities and towns in Region Zealand
Lejre Municipality